State Road 17 is a north–south road in Northern Indiana.  Its southern terminus is at State Road 25 in Logansport.  Its northern terminus is at U.S. Route 30 in Plymouth.

Route description 
SR 17 southern terminus is in Logansport at eastbound SR 25 (East Market Street).  One block north SR 17 meets the westbound SR 25 (East Broadway).  After SR 25, SR 17 heads north-northwest out of Logansport.  After Logansport SR 17 heads due north toward a T-intersection with State Road 114.  Where SR 17 turns west, with SR 114 heading east.  After SR 114, SR 17 has five 90 degrees curves, then SR 17 heads due north.  SR 17 heads north until Kewanna.  North of Kewanna SR 17 heads north toward Culver.  After Culver SR 17 heads north and then east toward Plymouth.  SR 17 enters Plymouth on the southwest side of town and heads toward downtown.  North of downtown Plymouth SR 17 heads north towards its northern terminus at US 30.

History 
Between 1917 and 1926, SR 17 was a route from Ligonier to the Ohio State Line, east of Butler, this route is the same as U.S. Route 6 takes today.  At this time the route that SR 17 takes today was unsigned.

Major intersections

References

External links

017
Transportation in Cass County, Indiana
Transportation in Fulton County, Indiana
Transportation in Marshall County, Indiana
U.S. Route 6